Victor Harold Flick (born 14 May 1937) is an English studio guitarist, best known for playing the guitar riff in the "James Bond Theme".

Biography
In the late 1950s, Flick joined the John Barry Seven. 

On the Dr. No soundtrack, he was lead guitarist on the track, the "James Bond Theme". Flick continued to contribute to the James Bond soundtracks from the 1960s through the late 1980s. He also played a pastiche of the "James Bond" guitar part for The Beatles' film Help! (1965). One of Flick's guitars, a Clifford Essex Paragon De Luxe, on which he played the original "James Bond Theme", was displayed at the Rock and Roll Hall of Fame in Cleveland, Ohio.

He also recorded with Herman's Hermits, playing the distinctive guitar riff in the intro and bridge of "Silhouettes", a 1965 UK Top 5 hit although this is disputed by Karl Green of Herman’s Hermits in an interview on the Sky Arts programme “The British Invasion”.

In 1999, he worked with composer Nic Raine, backed by the Prague Philharmonic Orchestra, on the James Bond tribute album titled Bond Back in Action. In 2003, he recorded the album James Bond Now, featuring tracks from James Bond soundtracks and new compositions.

In 2005, he played on the soundtrack of the From Russia With Love video game by Electronic Arts.

In 2008, his autobiography, Vic Flick Guitarman: From James Bond to The Beatles and Beyond, was published by Bearmanor Media.

On 5 October 2012 Vic Flick was honoured at the Academy of Motion Pictures Arts and Sciences for "The Music of Bond: The First 50 Years." He played the "James Bond Theme" on his 1939 Clifford Essex Paragon De Luxe “James Bond” Guitar to a live audience. He also was interviewed on stage by Jon Burlingame, a  writer on the subject of music for film and television.

Flick appeared on a 2013 episode of the History Channel show Pawn Stars titled "No Shirt, No Shoes, No Service". Here he brought in his 1961 Fender Stratocaster guitar to shop owner Rick Harrison, who, after consulting Jesse Amoroso, settled on a price of $55,000 for the guitar.
The guitar sold at auction in 2014 for $25,000.

Discography
West of Windward - 1968 - Rediffusion
 Bond Back in Action (Featured/1999)
James Bond Now (2003)

References

External links

John Barry Website (review of Vic Flick Guitarman: From James Bond to the Beatles and Beyond)

Vic Flick Interview - NAMM Oral History Library (2014)

1937 births
Living people
English session musicians
English pop guitarists
English male guitarists
People from Worcester Park